Marin Bosiočić (born 8.8.1988) is a Croatian chess grandmaster.

References

1988 births
Living people
Sportspeople from Rijeka
Chess grandmasters
Chess Olympiad competitors
Croatian chess players